Đồng Đăng station is a railway station in Vietnam. It serves the town of Đồng Đăng, in Lạng Sơn Province. It is the last station on the line before the Friendship Pass border crossing with Pingxiang, Guangxi in China. It is not possible for foreigners to board the international train at the station. The station is fitted with Dual gauge tracks.

See also
Beijing–Nanning–Hanoi through train
Hunan–Guangxi railway

References

Buildings and structures in Lạng Sơn province
Railway stations in Vietnam
China–Vietnam border crossings
1889 establishments in Asia